Der Frühling braucht Zeit is an East German drama film directed by Günter Stahnke. It was released in 1966.

Cast
 Eberhard Mellies as Heinz Solter
 Günther Simon as Erhard Faber
 Doris Abeßer as Inge Solter
 Karla Runkehl as Luise Faber
 Rolf Hoppe as Rudi Wiesen
 Hans Hardt-Hardtloff as Kuhlmey
 Erik S. Klein as Prosecutor Burger
 Friedrich Richter as Dr. Kranz
 Elfriede Née as Ruth Solter
 Agnes Kraus as Ursula Schmitz
 Heinz Scholz as Meermann
 Horst Schön as Schellhorn
 Kurt Barthel as Jensen
 Hans Flössel as Lehmann

See also
 Film censorship in East Germany

External links
 

1966 films
1966 drama films
German drama films
East German films
1960s German-language films
German black-and-white films
1960s German films